The Anna River is a  river on the Upper Peninsula of the U.S. state of Michigan.

It flows first to the southeast, then turns mostly east and receives the outflow from Mud Lake and the Valley Spur Creek. It is joined by Wagner Creek near the Wagner Falls Scenic Site and turns to the north into the city of Munising. Portions of the river run through the Hiawatha National Forest.

Several waterfalls in the river's watershed are regional attractions (in order from the mouth inland):
Horseshoe Falls on Stutts Creek near Munising. Directions: From M-28 near Munising's southern limits, turn east onto Prospect St. Go 2 blocks to Bell Avenue and turn left (north). Go 1 block to Horseshoe Falls parking area on the right.
Alger Falls on Alger Creek, about one mile (1.6 km) south of Munising where M-94 meets M-28. This waterfall cascades down  of rock and can be easily seen along the east side of M-28, although the water flow varies considerably.
The state-owned,  Wagner Falls Scenic Site encompasses Wagner Falls.

References 

Rivers of Alger County, Michigan
Rivers of Michigan
Tributaries of Lake Superior